Abisara tantalus, the blue-spot Judy, is a butterfly in the family Riodinidae. It is found in Guinea, Liberia, Ivory Coast, Ghana, Nigeria, Cameroon, the Republic of the Congo, Angola and the Democratic Republic of the Congo. The habitat consists of humid and dense forests.

Subspecies
Abisara tantalus tantalus (Guinea, Liberia, Ivory Coast, Ghana)
Abisara tantalus caerulea Carpenter & Jackson, 1950 (Nigeria: south and Cross River loop, Cameroon, Congo, Angola, Democratic Republic of the Congo)
Abisara tantalus cyanis Callaghan, 2003 (eastern Democratic Republic of the Congo)

References

Butterflies described in 1861
Abisara
Butterflies of Africa
Taxa named by William Chapman Hewitson